The Chief Electoral Officer for Northern Ireland is the returning officer and electoral registration officer for all elections in Northern Ireland and is in charge of the Electoral Office for Northern Ireland. He/she also has to make a recommendation to the Secretary of State for Northern Ireland by 16 April each year regarding whether a registration canvass should be conducted, and acts as an assessor to the Boundary Commission for Northern Ireland and the Local Government Boundaries Commissioner.

Since 1 February 2017, the Chief Electoral Officer is Virginia McVea. Graham Shields had previously served as Chief Electoral Officer from late 2010.

References

Elections in Northern Ireland